Archbishop Paul (secular name Yrjö Olmari, born Georgi Alvovich Gusev, ; August 28, 1914 – December 2, 1988) was the primate of the Finnish Orthodox Church and Archbishop of Karelia and All Finland from 1960 to 1987.

Life
Georgi Gusev was born in St. Petersburg, Russia on August 28, 1914 to Alvi Gusev and his wife Anna (née Vodomensky) of St. Petersburg. When the Russian Revolution broke out the family moved to Viipuri/Vyborg in Finland on the Gulf of Finland and changed their family name to Olmari. George changed his given name to the Finnish Yrjö. In 1926, Yrjö attended the classic grammar school in Viipuri, but his attendance was cut short by the death of his father in 1932. In 1932 he entered the seminary in Sortavala and graduated in 1936. After graduating he carried out his obligatory military service.

At the seminary, Yrjö worked with the student choir and as deputy director of the Sortavala Cathedral choir. He also began adapting the Slavic language vocal music of the church for use with Finnish. In late 1937, Yrjö joined the Valaam Monastery on Lake Lodoga, which at the time was within the borders of Finland. In 1938 at the age of twenty three, Yrjö was tonsured a monk with the name Paavali (Finnish form of Paul) and entered Holy Orders. Paavali taught at the monastery school and directed a choir of Finnish speaking novices.

During the period of hostilities between Finland and the Soviet Union, lasting from the Winter War of 1939/1940 and its continuation through World War II, Fr. Paavali was initially called to service as a military chaplain and took part in the evacuation of Valaam monastery. As the war continued he served as a priest to evacuees in Joensuu and Kauhava. During the Continuation War he served in the Aunus (Onega) district in eastern Karelia and after transfer to Jamsa in 1942, he taught religion at a camp for students from eastern Karelia.

After the war Paavali served the Joensuu community as a priest, and was appointed editor at the Council of the Publication of Orthodox Literature. He also was named editor-in-chief of the magazine Dawn. In 1948 he was assigned as priest to a congregation in Kuopio where he also began editing liturgical service books and scores for church vocal music. In his editorial work he placed emphasis of the importance of divine worship and Holy Communion, pruning cultural features from the texts to produce a collection of texts and music designed for worship in Finnish. This collection came to be known as "Paavali's liturgy." After his death, many of his alterations to the divine liturgy has been abolished.

In 1955 Paavali was elected Bishop of Joensuu (the assistant bishop to the Archbishop of Karelia), a position that had been vacant since 1925. On August 29, 1960, he was elected Archbishop of Karelia and All Finland. Under his leadership the Orthodox Church was recognised as the Second Finnish State Church in 1978.

Paavali worked in the development of the liturgical life of the Finnish Church, encouraging frequent communion of the faithful; Church membership grew. He also worked on the development of New Valaam Monastery as a functioning monastery as well as the site of an Orthodox Culture and Research Institute.

Paavali wrote a number of books on Eastern Orthodoxy and Orthodox life. The most notable in English was The Faith We Hold, . In 1967 he was awarded an honorary doctorate by the Theological Faculty of the University of Helsinki. Also, he was named a member of the Leningrad Theological Academy.

Paavali retired as Archbishop of Karelia in 1987 and was succeeded by Johannes (Rinne). On December 2, 1988, he died and was buried in the cemetery of New Valaam Monastery.

Bibliography 
 The Faith We Hold. transl. by Marita Nykänen and Esther Williams; with a foreword by Alexander Schmemann. Crestwood, N.Y. : St. Vladimir's Seminary Press 1980.
 The Feast of Faith: An Invitation to the Love Feast of the Kingdom of God. transl. Esther Williams. Crestwood, NY : St Vladimir's Seminary Press, 1988.

References

Sources
Borrowed text from the Orthodox Wiki article 
  Paavali (1914 - 1988)
Paavali_(arkkipiispa) In Finnish

1914 births
1988 deaths
Eastern Orthodox Archbishops of Finland
Vicar bishops of the Finnish Orthodox Church
20th-century Eastern Orthodox bishops
People from Vyborg
Finnish military chaplains
Finnish people of Russian descent